Danville Main Street Historic District is a national historic district located at Danville, Hendricks County, Indiana.  The district encompasses 37 contributing buildings in a residential section of Danville.  The district developed between about 1844 and 1920 and includes notable examples of Greek Revival, Gothic Revival, Italianate, Queen Anne, American Foursquare, and Bungalow / American Craftsman style architecture.  Notable buildings include the Harry Underwood House (1914), J.W. Morgan House (1868), John Shirley House (1885), and the Scearce House (1910).

It was added to the National Register of Historic Places in 1994.

References

Historic districts on the National Register of Historic Places in Indiana
Greek Revival architecture in Indiana
Gothic Revival architecture in Indiana
Italianate architecture in Indiana
Queen Anne architecture in Indiana
National Register of Historic Places in Hendricks County, Indiana
Historic districts in Hendricks County, Indiana